Cyperus pilosulus is a species of sedge that is native to parts of Tanzania.

See also 
 List of Cyperus species

References 

pilosulus
Plants described in 1936
Flora of Tanzania